Marshall Islands National Olympic Committee (IOC code: MHL) is the National Olympic Committee representing Marshall Islands.

References 

Marshall Islands
 
Olympic
Sports organizations established in 2001
2001 establishments in the Marshall Islands